Thirumalapur is a small village in Doulthabad Mandal and Medak district, Telangana, India.

The main occupation in the village is agriculture with popular crops including paddy, corn, cotton, and sunflower.

Temple: Hanuman, Lord Shiva

Villages in Medak district